The Bottom of the Well is a 1917 American silent drama film directed by John S. Robertson and starring Evart Overton, Agnes Ayres and Adele DeGarde.

Cast
 Evart Overton as Stanley Deane 
 Agnes Ayres as Alice Buckingham 
 Adele DeGarde as Dorothy Farnsworth 
 Ned Finley as Capt. Jake Starke 
 Herbert Prior as 'Long Bill' Parker 
 Robert Gaillard as David Thomas 
 Alice Terry as Anita Thomas 
 Bigelow Cooper as Amos Buckingham

References

Bibliography
 Slide, Anthony. The Big V: A History of the Vitagraph Company. Scarecrow Press, 1987.

External links
 

1917 films
1917 drama films
1910s English-language films
American silent feature films
Silent American drama films
American black-and-white films
Films directed by John S. Robertson
Vitagraph Studios films
1910s American films